The Bad Guys is a 2022 American computer-animated heist comedy film loosely based on the children's book series of the same name by Aaron Blabey, produced by DreamWorks Animation Studios and distributed by Universal Pictures. The film was directed by Pierre Perifel (in his feature directorial debut) from a screenplay by Etan Cohen, and stars the voices of Sam Rockwell, Marc Maron, Awkwafina, Craig Robinson, Anthony Ramos, Richard Ayoade, Zazie Beetz, Alex Borstein, and Lilly Singh. It tells the story of a criminal group of anthropomorphic animals who, upon being caught, pretend to attempt to reform themselves as model citizens, only for their leader to find himself genuinely drawn to changing his ways for good as a new villain has his own plans.

Work on the film started in March 2018, with Cohen writing the screenplay; the characters and themes drew inspiration from various crime films and anime series such as Pulp Fiction (1994), the Ocean's film trilogy, Lupin III, and Sherlock Hound, while the inspiration for the film's animation style came from Sony Pictures Animation's Spider-Man: Into the Spider-Verse (2018). Production began at DreamWorks Animation's Glendale campus and some additional production assets were borrowed from Jellyfish Pictures, with voice acting being done remotely due to the COVID-19 pandemic.

The Bad Guys was released theatrically in several countries beginning March 16, 2022, and in the United States on April 22, in 2D and RealD 3D formats. It received positive reviews from critics for its animation, writing, humor, and voice acting. It was also a box office success, grossing over $250 million worldwide.

Plot

In a world where humans and anthropomorphic animals co-exist, cool-headed pickpocket and robber Mr. Wolf leads The Bad Guys, a gang of infamous criminal animals known for their countless thefts and evading authorities, especially from the hot-headed chief of police, Misty Luggins.

After being insulted by Governor Diane Foxington on live television, Wolf convinces his gang to pull off a heist to steal a valuable award called the Golden Dolphin before it's awarded to guinea pig philanthropist Professor Marmalade at a gala. During the heist, Wolf inadvertently helps an elderly woman and is praised for the good deed, leading to Wolf having conflicted feelings. The gang is arrested, but Wolf persuades Marmalade, with Foxington's approval, to reform them, though planning to steal the award again.

Marmalade takes the gang to his home, but they struggle with his lessons, unable to adapt to good behavior. When an attempt to rescue guinea pigs from a research lab goes awry due to Wolf's second-in-command, Mr. Snake, eating them, Foxington decides to call off the experiment, but relents when Wolf confesses that he became a criminal because he despises being hated for his species; she admits she understands and has hope for him. Wolf contemplates the matter and finds himself rescuing a cat from a tree, which Marmalade records and publishes, turning the public image of the gang around.

The gang executes a new heist to steal the award again during a gala, but Wolf - realizing the benefits of being good - cannot bring himself to finish the plan and decides to reform for real. Suddenly, a meteorite on display goes missing, and the gang is blamed for its theft and are promptly arrested. Marmalade meets them in private and reveals that he stole the meteorite and had planned for the gang to take the blame. He also reveals that he was the old woman Wolf had helped.

In prison, Wolf tells his gang that he does not want to be a criminal anymore and that they can all improve. Snake refuses, believing that the world will never see them as anything other than monsters. Their fight is interrupted when a mysterious person, later found to be Foxington, rescues them. Wolf identifies her as The Crimson Paw, a criminal mastermind who suddenly stopped committing crimes.

Now free, the gang abandons Wolf when they refuse to accept that they can change. They find their hideout wholly emptied of their loot, as Wolf had revealed its location to Foxington earlier to appease for his crimes. After Snake willingly gives Mr. Shark his last Push Pop out of kindness, the others realize that they can change their ways and proceed to help Wolf. However, Snake denies it and abandons them to ally with Marmalade, who plans to use the meteorite to power a mind-control device to hypnotize an army of guinea pigs into stealing his own charity funds.

Foxington reveals to Wolf that she reformed when she realized that she was only what everyone saw her as, and then decided to help people. Wolf and Foxington break into Marmalade's home to steal the meteorite, only to be captured by Marmalade and Snake. The rest of the gang rescues them and steals the meteorite while foiling Marmalade's heist. They arrive at the police station to turn in the meteorite until Wolf tries to bring Snake back despite his betrayal. During a chase, Marmalade betrays Snake to blackmail Wolf and steals the meteorite back.

After rescuing Snake and destroying Marmalade's mind-control helmet, the gang surrenders to the authorities to protect Foxington. Marmalade attempts to take credit for recovering the meteorite, but it is revealed to be a fake planted by Snake, who had faked his defection. He reveals that he secretly switched it for the manor's meteorite-shaped lamp and rigged the real one to explode, causing it to blow up Marmalade's manor. The shockwave causes the fake meteorite to fall onto Marmalade, and a diamond Marmalade stole from Foxington falls from his suit, which Luggins recognizes as having been stolen by the Crimson Paw years ago. Implicated as the Crimson Paw, Marmalade is arrested.

In a mid-credits scene set a year later, the gang is released from prison early in light of their good behavior and leaves with Foxington, ready to begin their new crimefighting careers.

Voice cast

 Sam Rockwell as Wolf, a witty, charming, pickpocket gray wolf and the leader of "The Bad Guys" gang, who also acts as the gang's getaway driver
 Marc Maron as Snake, a sarcastic and cynical safe-cracking snake, Wolf's second-in-command, as well as his closest friend 
 Awkwafina as Tarantula, a sharp-tongued and sarcastic expert hacker tarantula also known as "Webs"
 Craig Robinson as Shark, a childish and sensitive master of disguise shark
 Anthony Ramos as Piranha, a short-fused, loose-cannon piranha and the "muscle" of the gang
 Richard Ayoade as Professor Marmalade, a wealthy guinea pig philanthropist who suggests that Wolf's group start doing "good deeds", and secretly intends to steal from his own charity
 Zazie Beetz as Diane Foxington ( The Crimson Paw), a red fox serving as the state governor; a former master thief turned good who eventually helps mentor Wolf to do the same 
 Alex Borstein as Police Chief Misty Luggins, the hot-tempered human chief of police who is determined to arrest The Bad Guys at any cost
 Lilly Singh as Tiffany Fluffit, a local human news reporter with the tendency to exaggerate her reports

Production

Development
On July 22, 2017, Australia's The Daily Telegraph reported that several studios had expressed interest in adapting Aaron Blabey's book series The Bad Guys into a feature film. In March 2018, DreamWorks Animation announced the development of a film based on the book series, with Etan Cohen writing the screenplay. The following year, in October, it was reported that the film would be directed by Pierre Perifel in his feature directorial debut, with Cohen and Hilary Winston set to co-write the film's script. Throughout the development of the film, the crew worked remotely during the COVID-19 pandemic. The film was described as having "a similar twist on the heist genre that Shrek did on fairy tales, and what Kung Fu Panda did for the kung fu genre". Winston was only credited for Additional screenplay material with Ice Age: Dawn of the Dinosaurs writer Yoni Brenner while the film was executive produced by Cohen, Blabey, and Foundation Media's Patrick Hughes. The cast was announced on July 28, 2021.

Animation, design, and influences
The film's design was inspired by Sony Pictures Animation's Spider-Man: Into the Spider-Verse, with DreamWorks adopting a more illustrative and stylized aesthetic than their previous films. Character designs took inspiration from a mix of styles from directors such as Luc Besson's The Fifth Element, Michael Mann’s Heat, Steven Soderbergh's Ocean's Eleven, and Quentin Tarantino’s Reservoir Dogs, and Pulp Fiction. The film was also inspired by anime and manga series such as Sherlock Hound and Lupin III as well as the French-Belgian animated film Ernest & Celestine, due to how it influenced the approach to the characters.

While most of the animation for the film was provided by DWA Glendale, Jellyfish Pictures, who previously worked with DreamWorks on How to Train Your Dragon: Homecoming, Spirit Untamed and The Boss Baby: Family Business, handled the additional asset production services using proprietary softwares like Premo and Moonray, along with a new tool called Doodle – created for the 2D effects and for allowing the animators to move the lines around the character rigs. The film's opening diner scene, inspired by the similar opening scene from Tarantino's Pulp Fiction, is the longest one-shot in DreamWorks Animation history – it lasts two minutes, 25 seconds and seven frames.

Music

On June 22, 2021, Daniel Pemberton was signed to compose the score for the film, having previously composed the soundtrack for Spider-Man: Into the Spider-Verse. A song "Good Tonight" written by Pemberton and Gary Go was made and released on March 18 by Back Lot Music, performed by Anthony Ramos, who does the additional lyrics with Will Wells. The album was released on March 31 with two other new songs included with "Good Tonight", includes a cover of "Feelin' Alright" by Elle King (released on March 25) and "Brand New Day" by The Heavy. Director Pierre Perifel, producer Damon Ross and composer Daniel Pemberton recorded backup vocals on Brand New Day. Following the release of the film on April 22, a new remix of "Good Tonight" was released by Party Pupils.

Additionally, "Stop Drop Roll" by Can't Stop Won't Stop, "Howlin' for You" by The Black Keys, "Fly Me to the Moon" by Julie London and "Go" by The Chemical Brothers are heard in the film but not included in the soundtrack album. Furthermore, "Bad Guy" by Billie Eilish was only featured in the trailers.

Marketing
The film's marketing campaign began on December 14, 2021, with the release of the first trailer, one first-look photo, and a cast table read. The first trailer was also shown during theater screenings of Sing 2. A second trailer, released on February 23, 2022, accumulated nearly a quarter of a billion views by the time of the film's release. Social media analytic RelishMix said the film had a social media reach of 220 million before its debut, which was significantly lower than Sonic the Hedgehog 2s reach of 445 million, though they noted the high subscriber rate of the child-friendly Dreamworks YouTube channel. A television spot aired during the Super Bowl pre-game garnered 8.5 million views when it was released on YouTube. Overall, fourteen promotional YouTube videos attracted 110.1 million views. The Bad Guys also had a tie-in with the 2022 March Madness tournament, featuring a virtual bracket for the film's characters and commercials during pre and post-game coverage on TNT and TBS. A Snapchat AR lens of Mr. Wolf and a TikTok trend set to Billie Eilish's "Bad Guy" were used to promote the film. Deadline Hollywood said Universal took advantage of April Fool's Day (April 1), the day tickets went on sale, with the release of another Snapchat AR lens that went viral after it was used by popular influencers such as MrBeast and Michael Le, gaining 21.5 million views and over 1.8 million likes on TikTok.

Release
On October 7, 2019, it was reported that the film would be theatrically released on September 17, 2021, taking over the release date of Spooky Jack. In December 2020, the film was delayed with The Boss Baby: Family Business taking its original slot, though it was confirmed that it would get a new date "within the coming weeks" due to the COVID-19 pandemic. In March 2021, the release date was rescheduled to April 15, 2022. In October 2021, it was pushed back again by one week to April 22. The Bad Guys had a red carpet screening at the Ace Hotel Los Angeles on April 12, 2022, with Beetz in attendance. On March 1, 2022, Universal pulled the release in Russia in response to the Russian invasion of Ukraine.

Home media and streaming
Universal Pictures Home Entertainment released The Bad Guys on DVD, Blu-ray and Ultra HD Blu-ray and for digital download in the United States on June 21, 2022. The film was released on NBCUniversal's Peacock streaming service on July 1, 2022. As part of their 18-month deal with Netflix, the film was streaming on Peacock for four months, then moved to Netflix on November 1, 2022 for the next ten, and then will return to Peacock for the remaining four on September 1, 2023.

Reception

Box office
The Bad Guys grossed $97.2 million in the United States and Canada, and $153.4 million in other territories, for a worldwide total of $250.6 million.

In the United States and Canada, The Bad Guys was released alongside The Northman and The Unbearable Weight of Massive Talent, and was projected to gross $13–20 million from 4,008 theaters in its opening weekend. The film made $8 million on its first day, including $1.15 million from Thursday night previews. It went on to debut to $24 million, topping the box office. Deadline Hollywood noted that the over-performance was thanks to a diverse turnout, big marketing push, and recent success of family films. Women made up 56% of the audience during its opening. The ethnic breakdown of the audience showed that 40% Caucasian, 25% Latino and Hispanic, 20% African American, and 9% Asian or other. The film grossed $16.2 million in its second weekend, finishing first again. It made $9.6 million in its third weekend and $7 million in its fourth, both times finishing second behind newcomer Doctor Strange in the Multiverse of Madness. It stayed in the box office top ten until its eleventh weekend.

Outside the U.S. and Canada, the film earned $8.5 million from 25 international markets in its opening weekend. This included a strong $1.7 million opening in Spain, where it finished ahead of The Batman and tied with Encanto as the best debut in the country during the COVID-19 pandemic. In its second weekend, it made $6.5 million from 37 markets. Its third weekend added $10.5 million, which included a $3.1 million debut in the UK and $1.7 million from Australia, where the film had the best opening for an animated film since the start of the pandemic. It made $7.5 million in its fourth weekend, which included a debut in France of $1.5 million. The film crossed the $50 million mark outside the U.S. and Canada in its fifth weekend, ahead of its North American release, after adding $6.5 million. In its sixth weekend, the film made $5.9 million, which Deadline Hollywood noted as a "terrific 9% drop" before its release in China on April 29. The film added $9 million in its seventh weekend. This included an opening of $4.53 million in China, where it received a "strong" 9.1/10 rating from audiences on the Maoyan website. The film earned $7.2 million the following weekend, which included a debut of $1.93 million in Korea. The Bad Guys also surpassed the gross of Encanto in China. It made $6.7 million in its ninth weekend, crossed the $100 million overseas mark in its tenth weekend, and added another $5.8 million in its eleventh weekend. It made $8.9 million the following weekend, surpassing the earnings of Moana and Toy Story 4 in China. In its thirteenth weekend, it made $3.5 million.

Critical response
  Audiences polled by CinemaScore gave the film an average grade of "A" on an A+ to F scale, while those at PostTrak gave it an average score of 4 out of 5 stars.

The Washington Posts Kristen Page-Kirby gave 3 stars out of 4, and concluded: "The moral of the story doesn't pack a huge wallop. Not that it needs to. (We can't all be Encanto.) Still, it's clever, visually interesting and very, very funny. Even when the humor goes lowbrow, it makes narrative sense. A joke about flatulence is a lot funnier when it's essential to the plot. The Bad Guys gets that. In fact, The Bad Guys gets a lot of things. It knows precisely what it is — and what it sets out to do, it does well. It's a heist film with heart and humor, and where's the crime in that?" IGNs Ryan Leston gave a rating of 8 out of 10 and wrote: The Bad Guys is a slick, hilarious heist movie with buckets of laughs and a lot of heart. It's Ocean's Eleven meets Little Red Riding Hood with Sam Rockwell's Wolf going on a charm offensive to stay out of jail… and he might just win you over in the process. Richard Ayoade has a blast as the sanctimonious Professor Marmalade and the entire voice cast brings their A-game with some stellar gags that will get you roaring with laughter. The Bad Guys is a fun, family-friendly caper that's bursting with action and brimming with laughs." Chicago Sun-Times's Richard Roeper gave the film 3.5 stars out of 4, and commented that "The animation combines computer-generated 2D and 3D with a look that will remind you of a Saturday-morning cartoon—only much crisper and more dazzling. There's nothing photorealistic about the animation; it's stylized and has very specific definition of Heist Movie Los Angeles, with the sky so bright it's almost overexposed, and yet somehow creating a bit of a noir vibe. This is a great-looking film with terrific performances, some lovely messaging and a steady parade of solid laughs—some the kids will enjoy and just as many targeted squarely at the grown-up kids in the audience."

The Guardians Wendy Ide gave 3 stars out of 5 and said: "Like Roger Rabbit, the pacing owes a debt to the demented frenzy of classic Looney Tunes animations, but the film also nods to heist movies, notably the Oceans series. It's deliberately preposterous – the disguises are rarely more convincing than the kind of false nose and moustache combo you might find in a cracker. But there's a kernel of believability where it matters: in the easy repartee and fully fleshed friendships. It's sharp, silly and frequently very funny."

Accolades 

The film was awarded the title of Truly Moving Picture Award at the 2022 Heartland Film Festival and was nominated for Best Animated Film at the Hollywood Critics Association and Satellite Awards. Beetz received a nomination for Outstanding Voice Performance at the 2023 Black Reel Awards. The film also was nominated for Outstanding Visual Effects in an Animated Feature at the 21st Visual Effects Society Awards, a Kids' Choice Award for Favorite Animated Movie as well as Awkwafina receiving a nomination for Favorite Female Voice From an Animated Movie at the 2023 Kids' Choice Awards, and for five Annie Awards (winning one).

The film was nominated for Best Edited Animated Feature Film and for Outstanding Achievement in Casting at the 38th Artios Awards.

Future

Possible sequel
In March 2022, after the film was released, Perifel said that he would love to do a sequel.

Television special
A holiday special inspired by the characters from the film is being produced by DreamWorks Animation Television. It will be directed by Bret Haaland from Fast & Furious Spy Racers, and executive produced by Haaland and Katherine Nolfi from Abominable and the Invisible City and Spirit Riding Free. The holiday special is set to debut sometime in 2023 on Netflix. The special will take place one year before the events of the film and will feature the titular Bad Guys reluctantly restoring holiday cheer to Los Angeles after Christmas was unexpectedly canceled.

References

External links

 
 

2022 films
2022 3D films
2022 crime films
2022 comedy films
2022 adventure films
2022 computer-animated films
2022 directorial debut films
2020s American animated films
2020s children's adventure films
2020s children's comedy films
2020s children's animated films
2020s adventure comedy films
2020s crime comedy films
2020s heist films
2020s English-language films
American 3D films
American computer-animated films
American children's animated adventure films
American children's animated comedy films
American adventure comedy films
American crime comedy films
American heist films
Animal adventure films
Animated crime films
Anime-influenced Western animation
Bad Guys (film), The
3D animated films
Animated films based on Australian novels
Animated films based on children's books
Films based on crime novels
Animated films about wolves
Animated films about snakes
Films about piranhas
Films about sharks
Films about spiders
Animated films about foxes
Fictional cavies
Films about rodents
Anthropomorphic animals
Supervillain films
Animated films about revenge
Films about hypnosis
Films about theft
Animated films set in Los Angeles
Films set in 2022
Films set in 2023
Films postponed due to the COVID-19 pandemic
Films impacted by the COVID-19 pandemic
Films with screenplays by Etan Cohen
Films scored by Daniel Pemberton
Universal Pictures films
Universal Pictures animated films
DreamWorks Animation animated films
Annie Award winners
Back Lot Music soundtracks